Erica G. Schwartz is a retired U.S. Public Health Service Commissioned Corps rear admiral who last served as the deputy surgeon general of the United States from January 2019 to April 2021. As a Commissioned Corps officer, she served with the U.S. Coast Guard as their Chief of Health Services and Chief of Preventive Medicine at the U.S. Coast Guard headquarters and became its principal expert on flu pandemics. Prior to becoming Deputy Surgeon General, she served as the Coast Guard's Chief Medical Officer from 2015 to 2019. She retired in April 2021 after over 27 years of combined uniformed service.

Early life and education
Schwartz graduated with a degree in biomedical engineering from Brown University in 1994 and was awarded a doctorate in medicine from the same institution in 1998. She later attended the Uniformed Services University of the Health Sciences and was awarded a master's degree in public health in 2000 and completed an occupational and environmental medicine residency in 2001.  Schwartz also has a Juris Doctor from the University of Maryland and has been admitted to the District of Columbia Bar.

Career
Schwartz served in the United States Navy in Annapolis, Maryland and Portsmouth, Virginia until 2005 when she joined the U.S. Public Health Service and transferred from the Navy to the U.S. Public Health Service Commissioned Corps.  
Early in her career, as a Navy officer, she served as an occupational medicine physician with postings that included chief of the occupational medicine, immunization and preventative medicine departments of the Annapolis, Maryland Naval Medical Clinic. Schwartz also served at the Navy and Marine Corps Public Health Center in Portsmouth, Virginia.

Schwartz served as Chief of Health Services and Chief of Preventive Medicine at the U.S. Coast Guard headquarters in Washington, D.C. where she implemented disease surveillance, vaccination, screening and NBC countermeasure programs. She wrote the service's first ever pandemic influenza, anthrax and smallpox vaccination, quarantinable communicable disease, periodic health assessment and HIV policies.  Schwartz also worked to develop health protection guidance for armed forces deployments following Hurricane Katrina, Hurricane Rita, the 2009 flu pandemic, the 2010 Haiti earthquake, the Deepwater Horizon disaster and the West Africa Ebola outbreak.  She was appointed as the Coast Guard's principal expert on flu pandemics. Schwartz has been awarded one Legion of Merit,  two Meritorious Service Medals, both the Coast Guard and Navy Commendation Medals and, in 2011, was recognised as one of the Military Health System female physicians of the year.

U.S. Public Health Service admiralship 

Schwartz was appointed to the rank of rear admiral in the commissioned corps along with her appointment as the U.S. Coast Guard's Chief Medical Officer on 17 August 2015. As chief, she concurrently served as the Coast Guard's Director of Health, Safety and Work-Life and had responsibility for managing the service's 42 clinics and 150 sick bays.  She oversaw the Coast Guard's environmental health and safety program, focusing on risk management and accident prevention.  She also led the service's work-life programs including: child care, culinary services, substance abuse prevention, suicide prevention, sexual assault prevention, personal financial management, ombudsman, health promotion, and employee assistance.

In January 2018, Rear Admiral Schwartz testified before the U.S. House Transportation Subcommittee on Coast Guard and Maritime Transportation on the need for the service to transition to an electronic health record system, in line with the other services of the U.S. Armed Forces. She stated that the current paper-based record and prescription system did not allow efficient transfer of records from the Coast Guard to the U.S. Department of Veterans Affairs.

Schwartz was selected for appointment as the Deputy Surgeon General of the United States on 1 January 2019. She choose to retire from the Commissioned Corps after being passed over by the Biden administration to become the acting surgeon general.

Schwartz was selected to serve as an Independent Director on the Aveanna Healthcare Board of Directors on 13 May 2021.

Schwartz was selected to serve as an Independent Director on the Butterfly Network Board of Directors on 9 September 2021.

References

External links
Rear Admiral Erica Schwartz, MD, JD, MPH - Deputy Surgeon General Official Bio 

Year of birth missing (living people)
Living people
Brown University alumni
Uniformed Services University of the Health Sciences alumni
University of Maryland, College Park alumni
Female United States Navy officers
United States Public Health Service personnel
United States Public Health Service Commissioned Corps admirals
Recipients of the Public Health Service Distinguished Service Medal
Recipients of the Legion of Merit
Recipients of the Meritorious Service Medal (United States)
Alpert Medical School alumni
21st-century American women